Adjutant André Julien Chainat was a French World War I flying ace credited with eleven aerial victories.

Early life

André Julien Chainat was born in La Chapelle-Saint-Laurian, France, on 27 June 1892. Chainat joined the French military on 25 October 1913 and was trained as an artilleryman. On 22 April 1914, he transferred to the 2eme Groupe d'Aviation and was posted to Escadrille B4, (the 'B' denoting the unit's use of Bleriots), on 20 July 1914, just in time for the beginning of the war.

Aerial service

He was subsequently selected for pilot's training, and received Pilot's Brevet No. 1165 on 8 June 1915. Nine days later, he was promoted to corporal. Twelve days after that, he  was assigned to Escadrille 23; he was later transferred on to Escadrille 38 on 1 November 1915. He was injured twice in accidents with this squadron.

On 17 January 1916, he was transferred to Escadrille 3. Four days later, he was promoted to Sergeant. He began using a Nieuport fighter; he added the motto L'Oiseau Bleu (Blue Bird) to the squadron markings on its fuselage. He used this motto, followed by a number, on each of his successive aircraft; his final SPAD VII was Blue Bird 6.

From March to September 1916, he continued to score victories, including sharing victims with Georges Guynemer and Alfred Heurtaux. Chainat was wounded once during this victory string, on 19 June, which he overcame; his second wounding, on 7 September 1916, removed him from combat. On 10 October, he was promoted to Adjutant.

On 1 January 1917, Chainat transferred to the 3eme Croupe d'Aviation.

Postwar
Andre Julien Chainat died in Cannes on 6 November 1961.

Honors and awards
Chevalier de la Légion d'honneur

"First class pursuit pilot. Has downed six enemy planes between 26 March and 12 July 1916. He was wounded on 16 June. Already cited four times in orders and received the Médaille militaire." (Chevalier de la Légion d'honneur citation, 3 August 1916)

Médaille militaire

"Pilot of great skill and bravery. On 26 March 1916, he attacked and downed a plane which fell in flames in front of our lines." (Médaille militaire citation, 5 April 1916).

Croix de guerre with nine palmes

Etoile de bronze, Mentioned in Dispatches four times

Sources of information

References
 Nieuport Aces of World War 1. Norman Franks. Osprey Publishing, 2000. , .
 Over the Front: A Complete Record of the Fighter Aces and Units of the United States and French Air Services, 1914–1918 Norman L. R. Franks, Frank W. Bailey. Grub Street, 1992. , .
 SPAD VII Aces of World War I. Jon Guttman. Osprey Publishing, 2001. , 

1892 births
1961 deaths
French World War I flying aces
Chevaliers of the Légion d'honneur
Recipients of the Croix de Guerre 1914–1918 (France)